From Me to You is the tenth studio album by American country music artist Charley Pride. It was released in 1971 on the RCA Victor label (catalog no. LSP-4468).

The album was awarded three stars from the web site AllMusic. It debuted on the Billboard magazine's country album chart on January 30, 1971, peaked at No. 2, and remained on the chart for 37 weeks. The album also included two No. 1 hit singles: "I Can't Believe That You've Stopped Loving Me" and "Wonder Could I Live There Anymore".

Track listing

See also
 Charley Pride discography

References

1971 albums
Charley Pride albums
albums produced by Jack Clement
RCA Records albums